Alexander IV (323/322– 309 BC), sometimes erroneously called Aegus in modern times, was the son of Alexander the Great (Alexander III of Macedon) and Princess Roxana of Bactria.

Birth
Alexander IV was the son of Alexander the Great (a Macedonian Greek)  and Alexander's wife Roxana (a Sogdian). He was the grandson of Philip II of Macedon. Because Roxana was pregnant when Alexander the Great died on 11 June 323 BC and the sex of the baby was unknown, there was dissension in the Macedonian army regarding the order of succession. While the infantry supported Alexander the Great's half-brother Philip III (who had some unknown cognitive disability present throughout his life), the chiliarch Perdiccas, commander of the elite Companion cavalry, persuaded them to wait in the hope that Roxana's child would be male. The factions compromised, deciding that Perdiccas would rule the Empire as regent while Philip would reign, but only as a figurehead with no real power. If the child was male, then he would be king. Alexander IV was born in late 323 BC or early 322.

Regents
After a severe regency, military failure in Egypt, and mutiny in the army, Perdiccas was assassinated by his senior officers in May or June 321 or 320 BC (problems with Diodorus's chronology have made the year uncertain), after which Antipater was named as the new regent at the Partition of Triparadisus. He brought with him Roxana and the two kings to Macedon and gave up the pretence of ruling Alexander's Empire, leaving former provinces in Egypt and Asia under the control of the satraps. When Antipater died in 319 BC he left Polyperchon, a Macedonian general who had served under Philip II and Alexander the Great, as his successor, passing over his own son, Cassander.

Civil war
Cassander allied himself with Ptolemy Soter, Antigonus and Eurydice, the ambitious wife of king Philip Arrhidaeus, and declared war upon the Regency. Polyperchon was allied with Eumenes and Olympias.

Although Polyperchon was successful at first, taking control of the Greek cities, his fleet was destroyed by Antigonus in 318 BC. When, after the battle, Cassander assumed full control of Macedon, Polyperchon was forced to flee to Epirus, followed by Roxana and the young Alexander. A few months later, Olympias was able to persuade her relative Aeacides of Epirus to invade Macedon with Polyperchon. When Olympias took the field, Eurydice's army refused to fight against the mother of Alexander and defected to Olympias, after which Polyperchon and Aeacides retook Macedon. Philip and Eurydice were captured and executed on December 25, 317 BC, leaving Alexander IV king, and Olympias in effective control, as she was his regent.

Cassander returned in the following year (316 BC), conquering Macedon once again. Olympias was immediately executed, while the king and his mother were taken prisoner and held in the citadel of Amphipolis under the supervision of Glaucias. When the general peace between Cassander, Antigonus, Ptolemy, and Lysimachus put an end to the Third Diadoch War in 311 BC, the peace treaty recognized Alexander IV's rights and explicitly stated that when he came of age he would succeed Cassander as ruler.

Death

Following the treaty, defenders of the Argead dynasty began to declare that Alexander IV should now exercise full power and that a regent was no longer needed, since he had almost reached the significant age of 14, the age at which a Macedonian noble could become a court page. Cassander's response was definitive: to secure his rule, in 309 BC he commanded Glaucias to secretly assassinate the 14-year-old Alexander IV and his mother. The orders were carried out, and they were both poisoned. There is controversy about the exact year of Alexander IV's death because of conflicting sources but the consensus of Hammond and Walbank in A History of Macedonia Vol. 3 is that Alexander was killed late in the summer of 309 BC, shortly after his alleged half-brother Heracles. However, Green thinks that Heracles was killed after Alexander IV's assassination.

One of the royal tombs discovered by the archaeologist Manolis Andronikos in the so-called "Great Tumulus" in Vergina in 1977/8 is believed to belong to Alexander IV.

References

Further reading
Smith, William (editor); Dictionary of Greek and Roman Biography and Mythology, "Alexander IV", Boston, (1867).

External links

Livius.org: Alexander IV
Wiki Classical Dictionary: Alexander IV

323 BC births
309 BC deaths
4th-century BC Babylonian kings
4th-century BC Macedonian monarchs
4th-century BC murdered monarchs
4th-century BC Pharaohs
Ancient child monarchs
Argead kings of Macedonia
Deaths by poisoning
Family of Alexander the Great
Greek people of Iranian descent
Monarchs of Persia
Murdered royalty of Macedonia (ancient kingdom)
People who died under the regency of Cassander
Pharaohs of the Argead dynasty
Monarchs who died as children